Kite is a young adult novel about red kites by Melvin Burgess. It contains 15 chapters and was first published in 1997.

When Taylor Mase steals a red kite egg, he is not expecting it to hatch out — but it does. Taylor feels an urge to protect the fragile baby bird, which faces many hazards, including Taylor's own father, a gamekeeper.

Publishing Information
1997 - First published by Andersen Press Limited
1999 - First paperback edition by Puffin Books
2000 - First USA edition by Farrar, Straus and Giroux
2005 - Education edition first published by Pearson Education
2005 - Second impression of education edition published by Pearson Education (ISDN 1 405 816465)

References

1997 British novels
1997 children's books
British young adult novels
Books about birds
Novels by Melvin Burgess
Andersen Press books